Ravindranath or Rabindranath is an Indian name and may refer to the following:

 Rabindranath Tagore (1861–1941), Bengali poet
 Rabindranath Bhattacharjee, Indian politician
 Rabindranath Maharaj (born 1955), Trinidad-born Canadian author
 Rabindranath Salazar Solorio (born 1968), Mexican politician
 Ravindranath Angre (born 1956), Indian police officer
 Ravindranath Bhargava, Indian politician
 Ravindranath Tewari, Indian politician
 Rabindranath Ghurburrun, Vice President of Mauritius
 S. A. Ravindranath (born 1946), Indian politician
 Vijayalakshmi Ravindranath (born 1953), Indian neuroscientist